Heliophanus dux is a species of jumping spider in the genus Heliophanus that lives in Yemen. The species was first described in 1994 by Wanda Wesołowska and Antonius van Harten.

References

Spiders described in 1994
Spiders of the Arabian Peninsula
Salticidae